Hildegard Brom-Fischer (1908-2001) was a Dutch textile artist, specializing in ecclesiastical embroidery.

Biography
Brom-Fischer was born on 16 July 1908 in Coesfeld, Germany. She studied at the training center for applied arts Werkkunstschule in Münster, Germany. She studied with Joos Jaspert. By 1937 she had located to the Netherlands, living in Amsterdam, Oudenrijn, Utrecht, and Bunnik. Brom-Fischer was a member of Nederlandsche Vereeniging voor Ambachts- en Nijverheidskunst (V.A.N.K.) the Dutch Association for Craft and Craft Art. She was married to Jan Eloy Brom. Focusing on Christian themes, she created multiple pieces featuring Saints Cosmas and Damian.

Brom-Fischer exhibited at the 1933 Milan Triennial and the Stedelijk Museum Amsterdam.

Brom-Fischer died on 22 April 2001 in Utrecht. Her work is in the collection of the Museum Catharijneconvent in Utrecht.

References

External links

1908 births
2001 deaths
20th-century women textile artists
20th-century textile artists
20th-century Dutch women artists
German emigrants to the Netherlands
Dutch embroiderers